Cholavaram, also spelled Sholavaram, is a suburb  north of Chennai, Tamil Nadu, India. It is popular as Sholavaram and is also known for the Cholavaram lake. Adjoining the lake, there was an defunct Air Force Airfield which was  used as a motor racing track. It was an air strip used during World War II; After the Madras Motor Sports Club was formed in mid-50s, it selected Sholavaram to conduct its racing events. Since then racing events took place every year and continued till late 1980s until the Madras Motor Sports Club built a new track at Irungattukottai, Sriperumbudur, Chennai.

The famous Malayalam actor Jayan was killed in a helicopter accident here during the shooting of his film Kolilakkam on 16 November 1980.

See also
 Chennai International Airport

References

External links
History of Sholavaram Racing Strip
Origins of Sholavaram

Sport in Chennai
Motorcycle racing
Motorsport venues in India
Tourist attractions in Chennai
Neighbourhoods in Chennai